Michael A Spracklen,  (born 15 September 1937) is a British rowing coach who has led teams from Great Britain, United States, Canada  to success at the Olympic games and World Rowing Championships, including the early Olympic successes of Steve Redgrave.  In 2002 he was named the International Rowing Federation coach of the year.

Spracklen was also part of the coaching team that brought Oxford University success in the annual Oxford-Cambridge Boat Race in the 1980s and early 1990s.

Spracklen's youngest son Adrian is a former British international lightweight oarsman and now coaches rowing at Mercyhurst College, Pennsylvania.

Life and career
Spracklen was born in Marlow, Buckinghamshire, England. He represented England and won a gold medal in the double sculls at the 1958 British Empire and Commonwealth Games in Cardiff, Wales.

Spracklen's first major success was in coaching the Great Britain double scull to silver in the Montreal Olympic Games 1976. In 1984, he coached the Great Britain coxed four to gold at the Los Angeles Olympics, Britain's first Olympic gold medal in rowing since 1948.  From that crew, he took Steve Redgrave and Andy Holmes to a further Olympic gold in the coxless pair (and bronze in the coxed pair) in Seoul in 1988, before moving to Canada as head coach of the national team in 1989.

The Canadian men's eight took gold at the 1992 Olympics under his tutelage, and Spracklen moved on to coach the U.S. squad.  He inaugurated the rowing venue at the new Chula Vista Olympic Training Center.  After a disappointing finishing position of fifth in the 1996 Atlanta Olympic eights, he returned to Great Britain as the women's national team coach.

Spracklen was also involved in the success of two highly successful single scullers, who switched to sculling from sweep rowing. After stroking the Canadian eight to gold in 1992, Derek Porter turned to single sculling and the following year became world champion. He continued to scull, and under Spracklen's programme he won silver in the 1996 Olympic Games. Jamie Koven also took to sculling after rowing in the US men's eight under Spracklen, and in 1997, he also became world champion.

In 1997 the British women won gold in the coxless four, silver in the double sculls and bronze in the eight. In the following year, 1998 the British women achieved their first heavyweight gold at a world championship, in the double sculls. After the 2000 Olympics, where the British women took silver in the quadruple sculls, the first Olympic medal for British women,  Spracklen's contract was not renewed, with the BBC reporting discontent in the squad over his methods. The silver medal in the women's quad launched a successful four-Olympic medal career for Katherine Grainger.

Spracklen began coaching the Canadian men's squad in 2000, winning the gold medal for eights at the 2002, 2003 and 2007 World Championships and at the 2008 Olympics. After leading Canada's men's eight to a gold medal in Beijing in 2008 and a silver at the 2012 London Olympics, Rowing Canada announced in the fall of 2012 that it was moving forward without Spracklen on its coaching team.

Coaching style
Spracklen's coaching revolves around finding a balance between the factors that affect the speed of the boat: Power (the effort per stroke), Length of Stroke, Rate (number of strokes taken each minute) and Technique.

Spracklen's ability to get athletes to commit fully to his program has been considered his greatest asset. A Spracklen athlete is expected have a balanced life 
but to prioritise rowing above other aspects of their lives. His program revolves around creating a core group of athletes which may or may not have previous experience on the world stage, and getting them to win. This core group then can be used to inspire a larger group to commit to the Spracklen program. Training runs in all seasons, with little to no cross-training and potentially 2 weeks off after a world championship or Olympic event. Training centers seldom require an invitation but rather allow anyone to participate in the training regime with the top athletes. That being said resources, including his time, are devoted to athletes and boats which are gold medal contenders.

Coaching titles

Honours
 1989 Officer of the Order of the British Empire
  1993  Meritorious Service Cross
 1998 UK and England Coach of the Year by the National Coaching Foundation
 2002 International Rowing Federation coach of the year.
 2004 Spirit of Sport Foundation coach of the year
 2007 Petro-Canada Coaching Excellence Award

References

Rowing coaches
Living people
1937 births
People from Marlow, Buckinghamshire
Commonwealth Games medallists in rowing
Commonwealth Games gold medallists for England
Officers of the Order of the British Empire
Recipients of the Meritorious Service Decoration
Rowers at the 1958 British Empire and Commonwealth Games
Medallists at the 1958 British Empire and Commonwealth Games